Moonstar can refer to:

 Moonstar88, a female-fronted musical group from the Philippines
 Danielle Moonstar (also known by the codenames Moonstar, Psyche and Mirage), a fictional character in the Marvel Comics X-Men franchise.
 The Moonstars, a fictional organization in the Forgotten Realms, derived from the Harpers
 Moonstar, originally published as Moonstar Odyssey, a science fiction novel by David Gerrold
 Moonbyul, Korean singer and rapper of Mamamoo